Telefomin Airport is an airport in Telefomin, Papua New Guinea. It was constructed during World War II and is the means of transportation in and out of Telefomin.

Airlines and destinations

References
World Airport codes

Airports in Papua New Guinea